Winter ice cream (  or  ) is a Hungarian confectionery similar in appearance to ice cream in a cone, but traditionally having ganache or a similar kind of sweet cream filling with usually a chocolate-cocoa flavoring. It gained popularity in the 1970s in communist Hungary, being produced as a winter alternative to "summer" ice creams, which were deemed to be too cold for winter sweets. Apart from grocery shops, it was frequently sold as part of the national railway's catering service. The confectionery's popularity faded in the early 1990s, when, after the end of communism, foreign candy manufacturers and their products appeared on the Hungarian market. However, along with some other snack foods and soft drinks of communist-era Hungary, winter ice cream garnered renewed interest in the late 2000s and 2010s.

Description 

Winter ice cream usually consists of a wafer cone with ganache filling in it, with dark chocolate coating being on the flat top of the filling. Cheaper formulations may use cocoa-flavored buttercream instead of ganache for filling and compound chocolate instead of dark chocolate for coating. The confectionery was originally mass-produced to be sold in shops, but it is now also available in pâtisseries, and it can be made at home with various novelty flavorings. Traditionally, the available flavorings were cocoa, vanilla, lemon and coconut.

The mass-produced variants don't require refrigeration while still having a relatively long shelf life (around 2–4 months). Originally weighing around 40 g or more, modern mass-produced winter ice creams are around 20–30 g.

See also 

 Túró Rudi

Notes and references

External links 

 WeLoveBudapest.com – Sweet Things: 13 classic Hungarian candies  – Old Hungarian candy products on WeLoveBudapest.com
 Taste Hungary – Old-School Hungarian Sweets – Old Hungarian candy products on Taste Hungary

Candy
Ice cream
Hungarian cuisine